This page lists all described genera and species of the spider family Tetragnathidae. , the World Spider Catalog accepts 989 species in 50 genera:

A

Alcimosphenus

Alcimosphenus Simon, 1895
 Alcimosphenus licinus Simon, 1895 (type) — Caribbean; apparently introduced in Florida.

Allende

Allende Álvarez-Padilla, 2007
 Allende longipes (Nicolet, 1849) — Chile, Argentina
 Allende nigrohumeralis (F. O. Pickard-Cambridge, 1899) — Chile (Juan Fernandez Is., mainland), Chile, Argentina
 Allende patagiatus (Simon, 1901) — Chile, Argentina
 Allende puyehuensis Álvarez-Padilla, 2007 (type) — Chile

Antillognatha

Antillognatha Bryant, 1945
 Antillognatha lucida Bryant, 1945 (type) — Hispaniola

Atelidea

Atelidea Simon, 1895
 Atelidea nona Sankaran, Malamel, Joseph & Sebastian, 2017 — India
 Atelidea spinosa Simon, 1895 (type) — Sri Lanka

Azilia

Azilia Keyserling, 1881
 Azilia affinis O. Pickard-Cambridge, 1893 — USA to Panama
 Azilia boudeti Simon, 1895 — Brazil
 Azilia eximia (Mello-Leitão, 1940) — Brazil
 Azilia formosa Keyserling, 1881 (type) — Peru
 Azilia guatemalensis O. Pickard-Cambridge, 1889 — Central America to Peru, St. Vincent
 Azilia histrio Simon, 1895 — Brazil
 Azilia integrans (Mello-Leitão, 1935) — Brazil
 Azilia marmorata Mello-Leitão, 1948 — Guyana
 Azilia montana Bryant, 1940 — Cuba
 Azilia rojasi Simon, 1895 — Venezuela
 Azilia vachoni (Caporiacco, 1954) — French Guiana

C

Chrysometa

Chrysometa Simon, 1894
 Chrysometa acinosa Álvarez-Padilla, 2007 — Chile
 Chrysometa adelis Levi, 1986 — Colombia
 Chrysometa alajuela Levi, 1986 — Costa Rica to Colombia
 Chrysometa alboguttata (O. Pickard-Cambridge, 1889) — Mexico to Colombia
 Chrysometa allija Levi, 1986 — Ecuador
 Chrysometa antonio Levi, 1986 — Colombia
 Chrysometa aramba Levi, 1986 — Brazil
 Chrysometa atotonilco Salgueiro-Sepúlveda & Álvarez-Padilla, 2018 — Mexico
 Chrysometa aureola (Keyserling, 1884) — Brazil, Trinidad
 Chrysometa banos Levi, 1986 — Ecuador
 Chrysometa bella (Banks, 1909) — Costa Rica
 Chrysometa bigibbosa (Keyserling, 1864) — Colombia
 Chrysometa bolivari Levi, 1986 — Ecuador
 Chrysometa bolivia Levi, 1986 — Bolivia, Colombia
 Chrysometa boquete Levi, 1986 — Panama, Colombia
 Chrysometa boraceia Levi, 1986 — Brazil, Paraguay, Uruguay
 Chrysometa brevipes (O. Pickard-Cambridge, 1889) — Mexico, Guatemala
 Chrysometa browni Levi, 1986 — Ecuador
 Chrysometa buenaventura Levi, 1986 — Colombia
 Chrysometa buga Levi, 1986 — Colombia
 Chrysometa butamalal Levi, 1986 — Chile
 Chrysometa cali Levi, 1986 — Colombia
 Chrysometa calima Levi, 1986 — Colombia
 Chrysometa cambara Levi, 1986 — Brazil
 Chrysometa candianii Nogueira, Pena-Barbosa, Venticinque & Brescovit, 2011 — Brazil
 Chrysometa carmelo Levi, 1986 — Colombia
 Chrysometa cebolleta Levi, 1986 — Colombia
 Chrysometa chica Levi, 1986 — Ecuador
 Chrysometa chipinque Levi, 1986 — Mexico, Guatemala
 Chrysometa choroni Levi, 1986 — Venezuela
 Chrysometa chulumani Levi, 1986 — Bolivia
 Chrysometa churitepui Levi, 1986 — Venezuela
 Chrysometa citlaltepetl Salgueiro-Sepúlveda & Álvarez-Padilla, 2018 — Mexico
 Chrysometa claudia Levi, 1986 — Venezuela
 Chrysometa columbicola Strand, 1916 — Colombia
 Chrysometa conspersa (Bryant, 1945) — Hispaniola
 Chrysometa cornuta (Bryant, 1945) — Hispaniola
 Chrysometa craigae Levi, 1986 — Costa Rica
 Chrysometa cuenca Levi, 1986 — Ecuador
 Chrysometa decolorata (O. Pickard-Cambridge, 1889) — Guatemala
 Chrysometa digua Levi, 1986 — Colombia
 Chrysometa distincta (Bryant, 1940) — Cuba
 Chrysometa donachui Levi, 1986 — Colombia
 Chrysometa duida Levi, 1986 — Venezuela
 Chrysometa eberhardi Levi, 1986 — Colombia
 Chrysometa ecarup Levi, 1986 — Colombia
 Chrysometa eugeni Levi, 1986 — Martinique, St. Vincent
 Chrysometa explorans (Chamberlin, 1916) — Peru
 Chrysometa fidelia Levi, 1986 — Colombia
 Chrysometa flava (O. Pickard-Cambridge, 1894) — Mexico to Brazil
 Chrysometa flavicans (Caporiacco, 1947) — Brazil, Guyana, Suriname
 Chrysometa fuscolimbata (Archer, 1958) — Jamaica
 Chrysometa guadeloupensis Levi, 1986 — Guadeloupe
 Chrysometa guttata (Keyserling, 1881) — Colombia, Venezuela, Peru, Brazil
 Chrysometa hamata (Bryant, 1942) — Puerto Rico
 Chrysometa heredia Levi, 1986 — Costa Rica
 Chrysometa huanuco Levi, 1986 — Peru
 Chrysometa huila Levi, 1986 — Colombia, Ecuador
 Chrysometa incachaca Levi, 1986 — Colombia
 Chrysometa itaimba Levi, 1986 — Brazil
 Chrysometa jayuyensis (Petrunkevitch, 1930) — Puerto Rico
 Chrysometa jelskii Levi, 1986 — Peru
 Chrysometa jordao Levi, 1986 — Brazil
 Chrysometa keyserlingi Levi, 1986 — Colombia
 Chrysometa kochalkai Levi, 1986 — Colombia
 Chrysometa lancetilla Levi, 1986 — Honduras
 Chrysometa lapazensis Levi, 1986 — Bolivia
 Chrysometa lepida (Keyserling, 1881) — Peru
 Chrysometa levii Álvarez-Padilla, 2007 — Chile
 Chrysometa linguiformis (Franganillo, 1930) — Cuba, Jamaica
 Chrysometa lomanhungae Nogueira, Pena-Barbosa, Venticinque & Brescovit, 2011 — Brazil
 Chrysometa ludibunda (Keyserling, 1893) — Brazil, Paraguay
 Chrysometa luisi Levi, 1986 — Ecuador
 Chrysometa machala Levi, 1986 — Ecuador, Peru
 Chrysometa macintyrei Levi, 1986 — Ecuador
 Chrysometa macuchi Levi, 1986 — Ecuador, Peru
 Chrysometa maculata (Bryant, 1945) — Hispaniola
 Chrysometa magdalena Levi, 1986 — Colombia
 Chrysometa maitae Álvarez-Padilla, 2007 — Chile
 Chrysometa malkini Levi, 1986 — Colombia
 Chrysometa marta Levi, 1986 — Colombia
 Chrysometa merida Levi, 1986 — Venezuela
 Chrysometa minuta (Keyserling, 1883) — Brazil
 Chrysometa minza Levi, 1986 — Ecuador
 Chrysometa monticola (Keyserling, 1883) — Peru
 Chrysometa muerte Levi, 1986 — Costa Rica to Colombia
 Chrysometa niebla Levi, 1986 — Colombia
 Chrysometa nigroventris (Keyserling, 1879) — Colombia or Panama
 Chrysometa nigrovittata (Keyserling, 1865) — Colombia, Ecuador
 Chrysometa nubigena Nogueira, Pena-Barbosa, Venticinque & Brescovit, 2011 — Brazil
 Chrysometa nuboso Levi, 1986 — Costa Rica
 Chrysometa nuevagranada Levi, 1986 — Colombia
 Chrysometa obscura (Bryant, 1945) — Hispaniola
 Chrysometa opulenta (Keyserling, 1881) — Peru, Brazil
 Chrysometa otavalo Levi, 1986 — Ecuador
 Chrysometa palenque Levi, 1986 — Mexico to Honduras
 Chrysometa pecki Levi, 1986 — Jamaica
 Chrysometa pena Simó, Álvarez & Laborda, 2016 — Uruguay
 Chrysometa penai Levi, 1986 — Ecuador
 Chrysometa petrasierwaldae Nogueira, Pena-Barbosa, Venticinque & Brescovit, 2011 — Brazil
 Chrysometa pichincha Levi, 1986 — Ecuador
 Chrysometa pilimbala Levi, 1986 — Colombia
 Chrysometa plana Levi, 1986 — Ecuador
 Chrysometa poas Levi, 1986 — Mexico to Panama
 Chrysometa puebla Levi, 1986 — Mexico
 Chrysometa purace Levi, 1986 — Colombia
 Chrysometa puya Salgueiro-Sepúlveda & Álvarez-Padilla, 2018 — Mexico
 Chrysometa ramon Levi, 1986 — Peru
 Chrysometa raripila (Keyserling, 1893) — Brazil
 Chrysometa rincon Levi, 1986 — Mexico
 Chrysometa rosarium Salgueiro-Sepúlveda & Álvarez-Padilla, 2018 — Mexico
 Chrysometa rubromaculata (Keyserling, 1864) — Colombia or Panama
 Chrysometa sabana Levi, 1986 — Hispaniola
 Chrysometa saci Nogueira, Pena-Barbosa, Venticinque & Brescovit, 2011 — Brazil
 Chrysometa sagicuta Salgueiro-Sepúlveda & Álvarez-Padilla, 2018 — Mexico
 Chrysometa saladito Levi, 1986 — Colombia
 Chrysometa santosi Nogueira, Pena-Barbosa, Venticinque & Brescovit, 2011 — Brazil
 Chrysometa saramacca Levi, 1986 — Venezuela, Peru, Suriname
 Chrysometa satulla (Keyserling, 1881) — Peru
 Chrysometa satura Levi, 1986 — Costa Rica
 Chrysometa schneblei Levi, 1986 — Colombia, Ecuador
 Chrysometa serachui Levi, 1986 — Colombia
 Chrysometa sevillano Levi, 1986 — Colombia
 Chrysometa sicki Levi, 1986 — Brazil
 Chrysometa sondo Levi, 1986 — Colombia
 Chrysometa sumare Levi, 1986 — Brazil
 Chrysometa sztolcmani Levi, 1986 — Peru
 Chrysometa tenuipes (Keyserling, 1864) (type) — Colombia
 Chrysometa tinajillas Levi, 1986 — Ecuador
 Chrysometa triangulosa Salgueiro-Sepúlveda & Álvarez-Padilla, 2018 — Mexico
 Chrysometa troya Levi, 1986 — Ecuador
 Chrysometa tungurahua Levi, 1986 — Ecuador
 Chrysometa uaza Levi, 1986 — Ecuador, Colombia
 Chrysometa unicolor (Keyserling, 1881) — Colombia or Panama
 Chrysometa universitaria Levi, 1986 — Costa Rica, Panama
 Chrysometa ura Levi, 1986 — Ecuador
 Chrysometa utcuyacu Levi, 1986 — Peru
 Chrysometa valle Levi, 1986 — Colombia
 Chrysometa waikoxi Nogueira, Pena-Barbosa, Venticinque & Brescovit, 2011 — Brazil
 Chrysometa xamaticpac Salgueiro-Sepúlveda & Álvarez-Padilla, 2018 — Mexico
 Chrysometa xavantina Levi, 1986 — Brazil
 Chrysometa yanomami Nogueira, Pena-Barbosa, Venticinque & Brescovit, 2011 — Brazil
 Chrysometa yotoco Levi, 1986 — Colombia, Venezuela
 Chrysometa yungas Levi, 1986 — Bolivia
 Chrysometa yunque Levi, 1986 — Puerto Rico
 Chrysometa zelotypa (Keyserling, 1883) — Costa Rica to Peru

Cyrtognatha

Cyrtognatha Keyserling, 1881
 Cyrtognatha atopica Dimitrov & Hormiga, 2009 — Argentina
 Cyrtognatha bella (O. Pickard-Cambridge, 1896) — Costa Rica
 Cyrtognatha bryantae (Chickering, 1956) — Jamaica
 Cyrtognatha catia Dimitrov & Hormiga, 2009 — Colombia
 Cyrtognatha eberhardi Dimitrov & Hormiga, 2009 — Brazil
 Cyrtognatha espanola (Bryant, 1945) — Hispaniola
 Cyrtognatha insolita (Chickering, 1956) — Costa Rica, Panama
 Cyrtognatha lepida (O. Pickard-Cambridge, 1889) — Panama
 Cyrtognatha leviorum Dimitrov & Hormiga, 2009 — Panama
 Cyrtognatha morona Dimitrov & Hormiga, 2009 — Ecuador
 Cyrtognatha nigrovittata Keyserling, 1881 (type) — Peru
 Cyrtognatha orphana Dimitrov & Hormiga, 2009 — Brazil
 Cyrtognatha pachygnathoides (O. Pickard-Cambridge, 1894) — Costa Rica, Panama
 Cyrtognatha paradoxa Dimitrov & Hormiga, 2009 — Mexico
 Cyrtognatha pathetica Dimitrov & Hormiga, 2009 — Guatemala
 Cyrtognatha petila Dimitrov & Hormiga, 2009 — Mexico
 Cyrtognatha quichua Dimitrov & Hormiga, 2009 — Ecuador
 Cyrtognatha rucilla (Bryant, 1945) — Hispaniola
 Cyrtognatha serrata Simon, 1898 — Martinique, St. Vincent
 Cyrtognatha simoni (Bryant, 1940) — Cuba
 Cyrtognatha waorani Dimitrov & Hormiga, 2009 — Ecuador

D

Dianleucauge

Dianleucauge Song & Zhu, 1994
 Dianleucauge deelemanae Song & Zhu, 1994 (type) — China

Diphya

Diphya Nicolet, 1849
 Diphya albula (Paik, 1983) — Korea
 Diphya bicolor Vellard, 1926 — Brazil
 Diphya foordi Omelko, Marusik & Lyle, 2020 — South Africa
 Diphya leroyorum Omelko, Marusik & Lyle, 2020 — South Africa
 Diphya limbata Simon, 1896 — Chile, Argentina
 Diphya macrophthalma Nicolet, 1849 (type) — Chile
 Diphya okumae Tanikawa, 1995 — China, Korea, Japan
 Diphya pumila Simon, 1889 — Madagascar
 Diphya qianica Zhu, Song & Zhang, 2003 — China
 Diphya rugosa Tullgren, 1902 — Chile
 Diphya simoni Kauri, 1950 — South Africa
 Diphya songi Wu & Yang, 2010 — China
 Diphya spinifera Tullgren, 1902 — Chile
 Diphya taiwanica Tanikawa, 1995 — Taiwan
 Diphya tanasevitchi (Zhang, Zhang & Yu, 2003) — China
 Diphya vanderwaltae Omelko, Marusik & Lyle, 2020 — South Africa
 Diphya wesolowskae Omelko, Marusik & Lyle, 2020 — South Africa
 Diphya wulingensis Yu, Zhang & Omelko, 2014 — China, Russia (Far East)

Dolichognatha

Dolichognatha O. Pickard-Cambridge, 1869
 Dolichognatha aethiopica Tullgren, 1910 — East Africa
 Dolichognatha albida (Simon, 1895) — Sri Lanka, Thailand
 Dolichognatha baforti (Legendre, 1967) — Congo
 Dolichognatha bannaensis Wang, Zhang & Peng, 2020 — China
 Dolichognatha comorensis (Schmidt & Krause, 1993) — Comoros
 Dolichognatha cygnea (Simon, 1893) — Venezuela
 Dolichognatha deelemanae Smith, 2008 — Borneo
 Dolichognatha ducke Lise, 1993 — Brazil
 Dolichognatha erwini Brescovit & Cunha, 2001 — Brazil
 Dolichognatha incanescens (Simon, 1895) — Sri Lanka, Indonesia (Borneo), New Guinea, Australia (Queensland)
 Dolichognatha junlitjri (Barrion-Dupo & Barrion, 2014) — Philippines
 Dolichognatha kampa Brescovit & Cunha, 2001 — Brazil
 Dolichognatha kratochvili (Lessert, 1938) — Congo
 Dolichognatha lodiculafaciens (Hingston, 1932) — Guyana
 Dolichognatha lonarensis Bodkhe & Manthen, 2015 — India
 Dolichognatha longiceps (Thorell, 1895) — India, Myanmar, Thailand
 Dolichognatha mandibularis (Thorell, 1894) — Indonesia (Sumatra)
 Dolichognatha mapia Brescovit & Cunha, 2001 — Brazil
 Dolichognatha maturaca Lise, 1993 — Brazil
 Dolichognatha minuscula (Mello-Leitão, 1940) — Guyana
 Dolichognatha nietneri O. Pickard-Cambridge, 1869 (type) — Sri Lanka
 Dolichognatha pentagona (Hentz, 1850) — USA to Venezuela
 Dolichognatha petiti (Simon, 1884) — Congo, Equatorial Guinea (Bioko)
 Dolichognatha pinheiral Brescovit & Cunha, 2001 — Brazil
 Dolichognatha proserpina (Mello-Leitão, 1943) — Brazil
 Dolichognatha quadrituberculata (Keyserling, 1883) — Peru
 Dolichognatha quinquemucronata (Simon, 1895) — Sri Lanka
 Dolichognatha raveni Smith, 2008 — New Guinea, Australia (Queensland)
 Dolichognatha richardi (Marples, 1955) — Samoa
 Dolichognatha spinosa (Petrunkevitch, 1939) — Panama
 Dolichognatha tigrina Simon, 1893 — Caribbean, northern South America
 Dolichognatha umbrophila Tanikawa, 1991 — Taiwan, Japan (Okinawa Is.)

Doryonychus

Doryonychus Simon, 1900
 Doryonychus raptor Simon, 1900 (type) — Hawaii

Dyschiriognatha

Dyschiriognatha Simon, 1893
 Dyschiriognatha bedoti Simon, 1893 (type) — Borneo
 Dyschiriognatha lobata Vellard, 1926 — Brazil
 Dyschiriognatha oceanica Berland, 1929 — Samoa
 Dyschiriognatha upoluensis Marples, 1955 — Samoa, Niue, Cook Is. (Aitutaki), Society Is.

G

Glenognatha

Glenognatha Simon, 1887
 Glenognatha argenteoguttata (Berland, 1935) — Marquesas Is.
 Glenognatha argyrostilba (O. Pickard-Cambridge, 1876) — Ivory Coast, Cameroon, Congo Egypt, Niger, Ethiopia. Introduced to Caribbean, Ecuador (mainland, Galapagos Is.), Brazil, St. Helena
 Glenognatha australis (Keyserling, 1883) — Ecuador to Argentina
 Glenognatha boraceia Cabra-García & Brescovit, 2016 — Brazil
 Glenognatha caaguara Cabra-García & Brescovit, 2016 — Brazil
 Glenognatha camisea Cabra-García & Brescovit, 2016 — Peru
 Glenognatha caparu Cabra-García & Brescovit, 2016 — Colombia, Venezuela, Suriname, Peru, Brazil, Bolivia
 Glenognatha caporiaccoi Platnick, 1993 — Guyana
 Glenognatha chamberlini (Berland, 1942) — French Polynesia (Austral Is.)
 Glenognatha dentata (Zhu & Wen, 1978) — China, India, Bangladesh, Myanmar, Vietnam, Philippines
 Glenognatha emertoni Simon, 1887 (type) — USA
 Glenognatha florezi Cabra-García & Brescovit, 2016 — Colombia
 Glenognatha foxi (McCook, 1894) — Canada to Panama
 Glenognatha ganeshi (Bodkhe, Manthen & Tanikawa, 2014) — India
 Glenognatha gaujoni Simon, 1895 — Ecuador, Colombia, Venezuela, Peru, Brazil
 Glenognatha globosa (Petrunkevitch, 1925) — Panama, Colombia, Venezuela
 Glenognatha gloriae (Petrunkevitch, 1930) — Puerto Rico
 Glenognatha gouldi Cabra-García & Brescovit, 2016 — USA, Mexico
 Glenognatha heleios Hormiga, 1990 — USA
 Glenognatha hirsutissima (Berland, 1935) — Marquesas Is.
 Glenognatha iviei Levi, 1980 — USA
 Glenognatha januari Cabra-García & Brescovit, 2016 — Brazil
 Glenognatha lacteovittata (Mello-Leitão, 1944) — Ecuador, Peru, Brazil, Argentina, Paraguay, Uruguay
 Glenognatha ledouxi Dierkens, 2016 — French Polynesia (Society Is.: Tahiti)
 Glenognatha mendezi Cabra-García & Brescovit, 2016 — Costa Rica, Colombia, Ecuador
 Glenognatha minuta Banks, 1898 — Mexico, Guatemala, Costa Rica, Panama, Cuba, Dominican Rep.
 Glenognatha nigromaculata (Berland, 1933) — Marquesas Is.
 Glenognatha osawai Baba & Tanikawa, 2018 — Japan
 Glenognatha patriceae Cabra-García & Brescovit, 2016 — Colombia
 Glenognatha paullula Sankaran, Caleb & Sebastian, 2020 — India
 Glenognatha phalangiops (Berland, 1942) — French Polynesia (Austral Is.)
 Glenognatha smilodon Bosmans & Bosselaers, 1994 — Cameroon
 Glenognatha spherella Chamberlin & Ivie, 1936 — Mexico to Peru
 Glenognatha tangi (Zhu, Song & Zhang, 2003) — China, Myanmar
 Glenognatha timbira Cabra-García & Brescovit, 2016 — Brazil
 Glenognatha vivianae Cabra-García & Brescovit, 2016 — Brazil

Guizygiella

Guizygiella Zhu, Kim & Song, 1997
 Guizygiella guangxiensis (Zhu & Zhang, 1993) — China, Laos
 Guizygiella indica (Tikader & Bal, 1980) — India
 Guizygiella melanocrania (Thorell, 1887) — India to China, Laos
 Guizygiella nadleri (Heimer, 1984) — China, Laos, Vietnam
 Guizygiella salta (Yin & Gong, 1996) (type) — China
 Guizygiella shivui (Patel & Reddy, 1990) — India

H

Harlanethis

Harlanethis Álvarez-Padilla, Kallal & Hormiga, 2020
 Harlanethis lipscombae Álvarez-Padilla, Kallal & Hormiga, 2020 (type) — Australia (Queensland)
 Harlanethis weintrauborum Álvarez-Padilla, Kallal & Hormiga, 2020 — Australia (Queensland)

Hispanognatha

Hispanognatha Bryant, 1945
 Hispanognatha guttata Bryant, 1945 (type) — Hispaniola

Homalometa

Homalometa Simon, 1898
 Homalometa chiriqui Levi, 1986 — Costa Rica, Panama
 Homalometa nigritarsis Simon, 1898 (type) — Cuba, Lesser Antilles, Mexico, Panama
 Homalometa nossa Levi, 1986 — Brazil

I

Iamarra

Iamarra Álvarez-Padilla, Kallal & Hormiga, 2020
 Iamarra multitheca Álvarez-Padilla, Kallal & Hormiga, 2020 (type) — Australia (Queensland)

L

Leucauge

Leucauge White, 1841
 Leucauge abyssinica Strand, 1907 — Ethiopia
 Leucauge acuminata (O. Pickard-Cambridge, 1889) — Mexico, Central America
 Leucauge albomaculata (Thorell, 1899) — Cameroon
 Leucauge amanica Strand, 1907 — East Africa
 Leucauge analis (Thorell, 1899) — Cameroon, Equatorial Guinea
 Leucauge annulipedella Strand, 1911 — Indonesia (Kei Is.)
 Leucauge apicata (Thorell, 1899) — Cameroon
 Leucauge arbitrariana Strand, 1913 — Papua New Guinea (Bismarck Arch.)
 Leucauge argentea (Keyserling, 1865) — Mexico, Colombia
 Leucauge argenteanigra (Karsch, 1884) — São Tomé and Príncipe
 Leucauge argentina (Hasselt, 1882) — Singapore, Indonesia (Sumatra), Philippines, Taiwan
 Leucauge argentina nigriceps (Thorell, 1890) — Malaysia
 Leucauge argyra (Walckenaer, 1841) — USA to Brazil
 Leucauge argyrescens Benoit, 1978 — Comoros, Seychelles
 Leucauge argyroaffinis Soares & Camargo, 1948 — Brazil
 Leucauge argyrobapta (White, 1841) (type) — USA to Brazil
 Leucauge atrostricta Badcock, 1932 — Paraguay
 Leucauge aurocincta (Thorell, 1877) — Indonesia (Sulawesi, Ambon)
 Leucauge aurostriata (O. Pickard-Cambridge, 1897) — Mexico, Panama
 Leucauge badiensis Roewer, 1961 — Senegal
 Leucauge beata (Pocock, 1901) — India
 Leucauge bituberculata Baert, 1987 — Ecuador (Galapagos Is.)
 Leucauge blanda (L. Koch, 1878) — Russia (Far East), China, Korea, Taiwan, Japan
 Leucauge bontoc Barrion & Litsinger, 1995 — Philippines
 Leucauge branicki (Taczanowski, 1874) — Ecuador, Guyana, Brazil
 Leucauge brevitibialis Tullgren, 1910 — East Africa
 Leucauge cabindae (Brito Capello, 1866) — West Africa
 Leucauge camelina Caporiacco, 1940 — Ethiopia
 Leucauge camerunensis Strand, 1907 — Cameroon
 Leucauge capelloi Simon, 1903 — Equatorial Guinea
 Leucauge caucaensis Strand, 1908 — Colombia
 Leucauge caudata Hogg, 1914 — New Guinea
 Leucauge celebesiana (Walckenaer, 1841) — Russia (Far East), Korea, India to China, Vietnam, Laos, Japan, Indonesia (Sulawesi), New Guinea
 Leucauge clarki Locket, 1968 — Angola
 Leucauge comorensis Schmidt & Krause, 1993 — Comoros
 Leucauge conifera Hogg, 1919 — Indonesia (Sumatra)
 Leucauge cordivittata Strand, 1911 — Indonesia (Kei Is.)
 Leucauge crucinota (Bösenberg & Strand, 1906) — China, Japan
 Leucauge curta (O. Pickard-Cambridge, 1889) — Panama
 Leucauge decorata (Blackwall, 1864) — Pakistan, India, Bangladesh to Thailand, Philippines, China, Japan, Indonesia, Papua New Guinea, Australia
 Leucauge decorata nigricauda Schenkel, 1944 — Timor
 Leucauge digna (O. Pickard-Cambridge, 1870) — St. Helena
 Leucauge ditissima (Thorell, 1887) — Sri Lanka, Myanmar
 Leucauge dorsotuberculata Tikader, 1982 — India
 Leucauge dromedaria (Thorell, 1881) — Australia, New Zealand
 Leucauge emertoni (Thorell, 1890) — Indonesia (Nias Is.)
 Leucauge eua Strand, 1911 — Tonga
 Leucauge fasciiventris Kulczyński, 1911 — New Guinea
 Leucauge festiva (Blackwall, 1866) — Africa
 Leucauge fibulata (Thorell, 1892) — Singapore, Indonesia (Sumatra)
 Leucauge fishoekensis Strand, 1909 — South Africa
 Leucauge formosa (Blackwall, 1863) — Brazil
 Leucauge formosa pozonae Schenkel, 1953 — Venezuela
 Leucauge fragilis (O. Pickard-Cambridge, 1889) — Guatemala, Costa Rica
 Leucauge frequens Tullgren, 1910 — East Africa
 Leucauge funebris Mello-Leitão, 1930 — Brazil, French Guiana
 Leucauge gemminipunctata Chamberlin & Ivie, 1936 — Panama, Brazil
 Leucauge granulata (Walckenaer, 1841) — India, Sri Lanka, China, Indonesia (Sunda Is.) to Australia, French Polynesia
 Leucauge granulata marginata Kulczyński, 1911 — New Guinea
 Leucauge granulata rimitara Strand, 1911 — French Polynesia (Rimitara)
 Leucauge hasselti (Thorell, 1890) — Indonesia (Sumatra)
 Leucauge hebridisiana Berland, 1938 — Vanuatu
 Leucauge henryi Mello-Leitão, 1940 — Brazil
 Leucauge idonea (O. Pickard-Cambridge, 1889) — Guatemala to Brazil
 Leucauge ilatele Marples, 1955 — Samoa
 Leucauge insularis (Keyserling, 1865) — Australia (Lord Howe Is.), Samoa
 Leucauge iraray Barrion & Litsinger, 1995 — Philippines
 Leucauge isabela Roewer, 1942 — Equatorial Guinea (Bioko)
 Leucauge japonica (Thorell, 1881) — Japan
 Leucauge kibonotensis Tullgren, 1910 — East Africa
 Leucauge lamperti Strand, 1907 — Sri Lanka
 Leucauge lechei Strand, 1908 — Madagascar
 Leucauge lehmannella Strand, 1908 — Colombia
 Leucauge leprosa (Thorell, 1895) — Myanmar
 Leucauge levanderi (Kulczyński, 1901) — Ethiopia, Congo, South Africa
 Leucauge linyphia Simon, 1903 — Equatorial Guinea
 Leucauge liui Zhu, Song & Zhang, 2003 — China, Taiwan
 Leucauge loltuna Chamberlin & Ivie, 1938 — Mexico
 Leucauge lombokiana Strand, 1913 — Indonesia (Lombok, Banda Is.)
 Leucauge longimana (Keyserling, 1881) — Peru
 Leucauge longipes F. O. Pickard-Cambridge, 1903 — Mexico
 Leucauge longula (Thorell, 1878) — Myanmar, Indonesia (Sumatra) to New Guinea
 Leucauge macrochoera (Thorell, 1895) — Myanmar, Indonesia (Sumatra)
 Leucauge macrochoera tenasserimensis (Thorell, 1895) — Myanmar
 Leucauge mahabascapea Barrion & Litsinger, 1995 — Philippines
 Leucauge mahurica Strand, 1913 — Papua New Guinea (Bismarck Arch.)
 Leucauge malkini Chrysanthus, 1975 — Solomon Is.
 Leucauge mammilla Zhu, Song & Zhang, 2003 — China
 Leucauge margaritata (Thorell, 1899) — Cameroon
 Leucauge mariana (Taczanowski, 1881) — Mexico, Hispaniola to Peru
 Leucauge medjensis Lessert, 1930 — Congo
 Leucauge mendanai Berland, 1933 — French Polynesia (Marquesas Is.)
 Leucauge meruensis Tullgren, 1910 — Tanzania
 Leucauge meruensis karagonis Strand, 1913 — Ruanda
 Leucauge mesomelas (O. Pickard-Cambridge, 1894) — Mexico
 Leucauge moerens (O. Pickard-Cambridge, 1896) — Mexico, Central America, Puerto Rico
 Leucauge moheliensis Schmidt & Krause, 1993 — Comoros
 Leucauge nagashimai Ono, 2011 — Japan
 Leucauge nanshan Zhu, Song & Zhang, 2003 — China
 Leucauge nicobarica (Thorell, 1891) — India (Nicobar Is.)
 Leucauge nigricauda Simon, 1903 — Guinea-Bissau, Equatorial Guinea
 Leucauge nigrocincta Simon, 1903 — West Africa, São Tomé and Príncipe, Equatorial Guinea(Bioko)
 Leucauge nigrotarsalis (Doleschall, 1859) — Indonesia (Ambon)
 Leucauge obscurella Strand, 1913 — Central Africa
 Leucauge opiparis Simon, 1907 — São Tomé and Príncipe
 Leucauge papuana Kulczyński, 1911 — New Guinea
 Leucauge parangscipinia Barrion & Litsinger, 1995 — Philippines
 Leucauge pinarensis (Franganillo, 1930) — Cuba
 Leucauge polita (Keyserling, 1893) — Mexico, Guatemala
 Leucauge popayanensis Strand, 1908 — Colombia
 Leucauge prodiga (L. Koch, 1872) — Samoa
 Leucauge profundifoveata Strand, 1906 — East Africa
 Leucauge pulcherrima (Keyserling, 1865) — Colombia, French Guiana
 Leucauge pulcherrima ochrerufa (Franganillo, 1930) — Cuba
 Leucauge pusilla (Thorell, 1878) — India (Andaman Is.), Indonesia (Ambon)
 Leucauge quadrifasciata (Thorell, 1890) — Indonesia (Nias Is.), Malaysia
 Leucauge quadripenicillata (Hasselt, 1893) — Indonesia (Sumatra)
 Leucauge regnyi (Simon, 1898) — Caribbean
 Leucauge reimoseri Strand, 1936 — Central Africa
 Leucauge roseosignata Mello-Leitão, 1943 — Brazil
 Leucauge rubripleura (Mello-Leitão, 1947) — Brazil
 Leucauge rubrotrivittata Simon, 1906 — India
 Leucauge ruwenzorensis Strand, 1913 — Central Africa
 Leucauge sabahan Dzulhelmi, 2016 — Borneo (Malaysia)
 Leucauge saphes Chamberlin & Ivie, 1936 — Panama
 Leucauge scalaris (Thorell, 1890) — Indonesia (Sumatra)
 Leucauge semiventris Strand, 1908 — Colombia
 Leucauge senegalensis Roewer, 1961 — Senegal
 Leucauge severa (Keyserling, 1893) — Brazil
 Leucauge signiventris Strand, 1913 — Central Africa
 Leucauge simplex F. O. Pickard-Cambridge, 1903 — Mexico
 Leucauge soeensis Schenkel, 1944 — Timor
 Leucauge speciosissima (Keyserling, 1881) — Peru
 Leucauge spiculosa Bryant, 1940 — Cuba
 Leucauge splendens (Blackwall, 1863) — Brazil
 Leucauge stictopyga (Thorell, 1890) — Indonesia (Sumatra)
 Leucauge striatipes (Bradley, 1876) — Australia
 Leucauge subadulta Strand, 1906 — Japan
 Leucauge subblanda Bösenberg & Strand, 1906 — Russia (Far East), China, Korea, Taiwan, Japan
 Leucauge subgemmea Bösenberg & Strand, 1906 — Russia (Far East), China, Korea, Japan
 Leucauge superba (Thorell, 1890) — Indonesia (Nias Is., Sumatra)
 Leucauge synthetica Chamberlin & Ivie, 1936 — Panama
 Leucauge taczanowskii (Marx, 1893) — French Guiana
 Leucauge taiwanica Yoshida, 2009 — Taiwan
 Leucauge talagangiba Barrion, Barrion-Dupo & Heong, 2013 — China
 Leucauge tanikawai Zhu, Song & Zhang, 2003 — China
 Leucauge tellervo Strand, 1913 — Central Africa
 Leucauge tengchongensis Wan & Peng, 2013 — China
 Leucauge tessellata (Thorell, 1887) — India to China, Vietnam, Laos, Taiwan, Indonesia (Moluccas)
 Leucauge thomeensis Kraus, 1960 — São Tomé and Príncipe
 Leucauge tredecimguttata (Simon, 1877) — Philippines
 Leucauge tristicta (Thorell, 1891) — India (Nicobar Is.)
 Leucauge tupaqamaru Archer, 1971 — Peru
 Leucauge turbida (Keyserling, 1893) — Brazil
 Leucauge uberta (Keyserling, 1893) — Brazil
 Leucauge undulata (Vinson, 1863) — Ethiopia, East Africa, Madagascar, Mauritius (Rodriguez)
 Leucauge ungulata (Karsch, 1879) — West, East Africa, Equatorial Guinea (Bioko), São Tomé and Príncipe
 Leucauge venusta (Walckenaer, 1841) (type) — Canada, USA
 Leucauge vibrabunda (Simon, 1896) — Indonesia (Java)
 Leucauge virginis (Strand, 1911) — Indonesia (Aru Is.)
 Leucauge viridecolorata Strand, 1916 — Jamaica
 Leucauge volupis (Keyserling, 1893) — Brazil, Paraguay, Argentina
 Leucauge wangi Zhu, Song & Zhang, 2003 — China
 Leucauge wokamara Strand, 1911 — Indonesia (Aru Is.)
 Leucauge wulingensis Song & Zhu, 1992 — China
 Leucauge xiaoen Zhu, Song & Zhang, 2003 — China
 Leucauge xiuying Zhu, Song & Zhang, 2003 — China, Laos
 Leucauge zizhong Zhu, Song & Zhang, 2003 — China, Laos

M

Mecynometa

Mecynometa Simon, 1894
 Mecynometa argyrosticta Simon, 1907 — West Africa, Congo
 Mecynometa gibbosa Schmidt & Krause, 1993 — Comoros
 Mecynometa globosa (O. Pickard-Cambridge, 1889) (type) — Guatemala to Brazil

Mesida

Mesida Kulczyński, 1911
 Mesida argentiopunctata (Rainbow, 1916) — Australia (Queensland)
 Mesida culta (O. Pickard-Cambridge, 1869) — India, Sri Lanka
 Mesida gemmea (Hasselt, 1882) — Myanmar to Indonesia (Java), Taiwan
 Mesida grayi Chrysanthus, 1975 — New Guinea
 Mesida humilis Kulczyński, 1911 (type) — New Guinea
 Mesida matinika Barrion & Litsinger, 1995 — Philippines
 Mesida mindiptanensis Chrysanthus, 1975 — New Guinea
 Mesida pumila (Thorell, 1877) — Indonesia (Sumatra) to New Guinea
 Mesida realensis Barrion & Litsinger, 1995 — Philippines
 Mesida thorelli (Blackwall, 1877) — Seychelles, Mayotte
 Mesida thorelli mauritiana (Simon, 1898) — Mauritius
 Mesida wilsoni Chrysanthus, 1975 — New Guinea, Papua New Guinea (Bismarck Arch.)
 Mesida yangbi Zhu, Song & Zhang, 2003 — China
 Mesida yini Zhu, Song & Zhang, 2003 — China, Laos

Meta

Meta C. L. Koch, 1836
 Meta abdomenalis Patel & Reddy, 1993 — India
 Meta birmanica Thorell, 1898 — Myanmar
 Meta bourneti Simon, 1922 — Europe, Georgia, North Africa
 Meta dolloff Levi, 1980 — USA
 Meta hamata Wang, Zhou, Irfan, Yang & Peng, 2020 — China
 Meta japonica Tanikawa, 1993 — Japan
 Meta longlingensis Wang, Zhou, Irfan, Yang & Peng, 2020 — China
 Meta manchurica Marusik & Koponen, 1992 — Russia (Far East), Korea
 Meta menardi (Latreille, 1804) (type) — Europe, Turkey, Iran
 Meta meruensis Tullgren, 1910 — Tanzania
 Meta mixta O. Pickard-Cambridge, 1885 — China (Yarkand)
 Meta monogrammata Butler, 1876 — Australia (Queensland)
 Meta montana Hogg, 1919 — Indonesia (Sumatra)
 Meta nebulosa Schenkel, 1936 — China
 Meta nigridorsalis Tanikawa, 1994 — China, Japan
 Meta obscura Kulczyński, 1899 — Canary Is., Madeira
 Meta ovalis (Gertsch, 1933) — USA, Canada
 Meta qianshanensis Zhu & Zhu, 1983 — China
 Meta serrana Franganillo, 1930 — Cuba
 Meta shenae Zhu, Song & Zhang, 2003 — China
 Meta simlaensis Tikader, 1982 — India
 Meta stridulans Wunderlich, 1987 — Madeira
 Meta tangi >Wang, Zhou, Irfan, Yang & Peng, 2020 — China
 Meta turbatrix Keyserling, 1887 — Australia (New South Wales)
 Meta yani >Wang, Zhou, Irfan, Yang & Peng, 2020 — China
 Meta tangi >Wang, Zhou, Irfan, Yang & Peng, 2020 — China

Metabus

Metabus O. Pickard-Cambridge, 1899
 Metabus conacyt Álvarez-Padilla, 2007 — Mexico, Guatemala
 Metabus debilis (O. Pickard-Cambridge, 1889) — Mexico to Ecuador
 Metabus ebanoverde Álvarez-Padilla, 2007 — Guatemala, Dominican Rep.
 Metabus ocellatus (Keyserling, 1864) (type) — Mexico to French Guiana

Metellina

Metellina Chamberlin & Ivie, 1941
 Metellina barreti (Kulczyński, 1899) — Madeira
 Metellina curtisi (McCook, 1894) (type) — North America
 Metellina gertschi (Lessert, 1938) — DR Congo
 Metellina haddadi Marusik & Larsen, 2018 — South Africa
 Metellina kirgisica (Bakhvalov, 1974) — Azerbaijan, Central Asia, China
 Metellina longipalpis (Pavesi, 1883) — Ethiopia
 Metellina mengei (Blackwall, 1869) — Europe to Caucasus, Iran, Russia (Europe to Altai)
 Metellina merianae (Scopoli, 1763) — Europe, Caucasus, Turkey, Iran, Russia (Europe to Central Asia)
 Metellina merianopsis (Tullgren, 1910) — Tanzania
 Metellina mimetoides Chamberlin & Ivie, 1941 — North America
 Metellina minima (Denis, 1953) — Canary Is.
 Metellina orientalis (Spassky, 1932) — Turkey, Armenia, Iran, Kazakhstan, Turkmenistan
 Metellina ornata (Chikuni, 1955) — Russia (Far East), China, Korea, Japan
 Metellina segmentata (Clerck, 1757) — Europe, Turkey, Israel, Caucasus, Russia (Europe) to Central Asia, China, Japan. Introduced to Canada
 Metellina villiersi (Denis, 1955) — Guinea

Metleucauge

Metleucauge Levi, 1980
 Metleucauge chikunii Tanikawa, 1992 — China, Korea, Taiwan, Japan
 Metleucauge davidi (Schenkel, 1963) — China, Taiwan
 Metleucauge dentipalpis (Kroneberg, 1875) — Central Asia
 Metleucauge eldorado Levi, 1980 (type) — USA
 Metleucauge kompirensis (Bösenberg & Strand, 1906) — Russia (Far East), China, Korea, Taiwan, Japan
 Metleucauge minuta Yin, 2012 — China
 Metleucauge yaginumai Tanikawa, 1992 — Japan
 Metleucauge yunohamensis (Bösenberg & Strand, 1906) — Russia (Far East), China, Korea, Taiwan, Japan

Mitoscelis

Mitoscelis Thorell, 1890
 Mitoscelis aculeata Thorell, 1890 (type) — Indonesia (Java)

Mollemeta

Mollemeta Álvarez-Padilla, 2007
 Mollemeta edwardsi (Simon, 1904) (type) — Chile

N

Nanningia

Nanningia Zhu, Kim & Song, 1997
 Nanningia zhangi Zhu, Kim & Song, 1997 (type) — China

Nanometa

Nanometa Simon, 1908
 Nanometa dimitrovi Álvarez-Padilla, Kallal & Hormiga, 2020  — Australia (Queensland)
 Nanometa dutrorum Álvarez-Padilla, Kallal & Hormiga, 2020  — Australia (Tasmania)
 Nanometa fea Álvarez-Padilla, Kallal & Hormiga, 2020  — Papua New Guinea
 Nanometa forsteri Álvarez-Padilla, Kallal & Hormiga, 2020  — New Zealand
 Nanometa gentilis Simon, 1908 (type) — Australia (Western Australia)
 Nanometa hippai (Marusik & Omelko, 2017)  — Papua New Guinea
 Nanometa lagenifera (Urquhart, 1888)  — New Zealand
 Nanometa lehtineni (Marusik & Omelko, 2017)  — Papua New Guinea
 Nanometa lyleae (Marusik & Omelko, 2017)  — Papua New Guinea
 Nanometa padillai (Marusik & Omelko, 2017)  — Papua New Guinea
 Nanometa purpurapunctata (Urquhart, 1889)  — New Zealand
 Nanometa sarasini (Berland, 1924)  — New Caledonia
 Nanometa tasmaniensis Álvarez-Padilla, Kallal & Hormiga, 2020  — Australia (Tasmania)
 Nanometa tetracaena Álvarez-Padilla, Kallal & Hormiga, 2020  — Australia (Victoria, New South Wales, Tasmania)
 Nanometa trivittata (Keyserling, 1887)  — Australia (Queensland, New South Wales, Victoria)

Neoprolochus

Neoprolochus Reimoser, 1927
 Neoprolochus jacobsoni Reimoser, 1927 (type) — Indonesia (Sumatra)

O

Okileucauge

Okileucauge Tanikawa, 2001
 Okileucauge elongatus Zhao, Peng & Huang, 2012 — China
 Okileucauge geminuscavum Chen & Zhu, 2009 — China
 Okileucauge gongshan Zhao, Peng & Huang, 2012 — China
 Okileucauge hainan Zhu, Song & Zhang, 2003 — China
 Okileucauge nigricauda Zhu, Song & Zhang, 2003 — China
 Okileucauge sasakii Tanikawa, 2001 — Japan
 Okileucauge tanikawai Zhu, Song & Zhang, 2003 — China
 Okileucauge tibet Zhu, Song & Zhang, 2003 — China
 Okileucauge yinae Zhu, Song & Zhang, 2003 — China

Opadometa

Opadometa Archer, 1951
 Opadometa fastigata (Simon, 1877) — India to Philippines, Indonesia (Sulawesi)
 Opadometa fastigata korinchica (Hogg, 1919) — Indonesia (Sumatra)
 Opadometa grata (Guérin, 1838) (type) — Japan, Laos, Indonesia, New Guinea, Solomon Is.
 Opadometa grata anirensis (Strand, 1911) — Papua New Guinea (Anir Is.)
 Opadometa grata bukaensis (Strand, 1911) — Papua New Guinea (New Ireland), Solomon Is.
 Opadometa grata maitlandensis (Strand, 1911) — Papua New Guinea (New Ireland)
 Opadometa grata mathiasensis (Strand, 1911) — Papua New Guinea (St. Matthias Is.)
 Opadometa grata salomonum (Strand, 1911) — Solomon Is.
 Opadometa grata squallyensis (Strand, 1911) — Papua New Guinea (Squally Is.)
 Opadometa grata tomaensis (Strand, 1911) — Papua New Guinea (New Britain)
 Opadometa kuchingensis Dzulhelmi & Suriyanti, 2015 — Borneo
 Opadometa sarawakensis Dzulhelmi & Suriyanti, 2015 — Malaysia (Borneo), Brunei

Opas

Opas O. Pickard-Cambridge, 1896
 Opas caudacuta (Taczanowski, 1873) — Peru, Guyana
 Opas caudata (Mello-Leitão, 1944) — Brazil
 Opas lugens O. Pickard-Cambridge, 1896 (type) — Mexico, Panama
 Opas melanoleuca (Mello-Leitão, 1944) — Brazil
 Opas paranensis (Mello-Leitão, 1937) — Brazil
 Opas trilineata (Mello-Leitão, 1940) — Brazil

Orsinome

Orsinome Thorell, 1890
 Orsinome armata Pocock, 1901 — India
 Orsinome cavernicola (Thorell, 1878) — Indonesia (Ambon)
 Orsinome daiqin Zhu, Song & Zhang, 2003 — China
 Orsinome diporusa Zhu, Song & Zhang, 2003 — China
 Orsinome elberti Strand, 1911 — Timor
 Orsinome jiarui Zhu, Song & Zhang, 2003 — China
 Orsinome lorentzi Kulczyński, 1911 — New Guinea
 Orsinome megaloverpa Kallal & Hormiga, 2018 — Philippines
 Orsinome monulfi Chrysanthus, 1971 — New Guinea
 Orsinome phrygiana Simon, 1901 — Malaysia
 Orsinome pilatrix (Thorell, 1878) — Indonesia (Ambon)
 Orsinome trappensis Schenkel, 1953 — China
 Orsinome vethi (Hasselt, 1882) (type) — India, China, Vietnam, Laos, Malaysia, Indonesia (Sumatra, Java, Flores)

P

Pachygnatha

Pachygnatha Sundevall, 1823
 Pachygnatha amurensis Strand, 1907 — Russia (Far East), China
 Pachygnatha atromarginata Bosmans & Bosselaers, 1994 — Cameroon
 Pachygnatha autumnalis Marx, 1884 — USA, Canada, Cuba
 Pachygnatha bispiralis Nzigidahera & Jocqué, 2014 — Burundi
 Pachygnatha bonneti Senglet, 1973 — Spain
 Pachygnatha brevis Keyserling, 1884 — USA, Canada
 Pachygnatha calusa Levi, 1980 — USA
 Pachygnatha clercki Sundevall, 1823 (type) — North America, Europe, Caucasus, Russia (Europe to Far East), Central Asia, China, Korea, Japan
 Pachygnatha clerckoides Wunderlich, 1985 — Albania, Macedonia, Bulgaria, Russia (Europe)
 Pachygnatha degeeri Sundevall, 1830 — Europe, Turkey, Caucasus, Russia (Europe to Far East), Central Asia, China
 Pachygnatha degeeri dysdericolor Jocqué, 1977 — Morocco
 Pachygnatha dorothea McCook, 1894 — USA, Canada
 Pachygnatha fengzhen Zhu, Song & Zhang, 2003 — China
 Pachygnatha furcillata Keyserling, 1884 — USA
 Pachygnatha goedeli Bosmans & Bosselaers, 1994 — Cameroon
 Pachygnatha hexatracheata Bosmans & Bosselaers, 1994 — Cameroon
 Pachygnatha intermedia Nzigidahera & Jocqué, 2014 — Burundi
 Pachygnatha jansseni Bosmans & Bosselaers, 1994 — Cameroon
 Pachygnatha kiwuana Strand, 1913 — Congo
 Pachygnatha leleupi Lawrence, 1952 — Cameroon, Congo, Malawi, Zimbabwe
 Pachygnatha listeri Sundevall, 1830 — Europe, Turkey, Caucasus, Russia (Europe to Far East), Kazakhstan
 Pachygnatha longipes Simon, 1894 — Madagascar
 Pachygnatha monticola Baba & Tanikawa, 2018 — Japan
 Pachygnatha mucronata Tullgren, 1910 — East Africa
 Pachygnatha mucronata comorana Schmidt & Krause, 1993 — Comoros
 Pachygnatha ochongipina Barrion & Litsinger, 1995 — Philippines
 Pachygnatha okuensis Bosmans & Bosselaers, 1994 — Cameroon
 Pachygnatha opdeweerdtae Bosmans & Bosselaers, 1994 — Cameroon
 Pachygnatha palmquisti Tullgren, 1910 — Kenya, Tanzania
 Pachygnatha procincta Bosmans & Bosselaers, 1994 — Cameroon, Burundi, Kenya
 Pachygnatha quadrimaculata (Bösenberg & Strand, 1906) — Russia (Far East), China, Korea, Japan
 Pachygnatha rotunda Saito, 1939 — Japan
 Pachygnatha ruanda Strand, 1913 — Rwanda
 Pachygnatha simoni Senglet, 1973 — Spain
 Pachygnatha sundevalli Senglet, 1973 — Portugal, Spain
 Pachygnatha tenera Karsch, 1879 — Russia (Far East), China, Korea, Japan
 Pachygnatha terilis Thaler, 1991 — Switzerland, Austria, Italy
 Pachygnatha tristriata C. L. Koch, 1845 — USA, Canada
 Pachygnatha tullgreni Senglet, 1973 — Portugal
 Pachygnatha ventricosa Nzigidahera & Jocqué, 2014 — Burundi
 Pachygnatha vorax Thorell, 1895 — Myanmar
 Pachygnatha xanthostoma C. L. Koch, 1845 — USA, Canada
 Pachygnatha zappa Bosmans & Bosselaers, 1994 — Cameroon, Kenya, Malawi, South Africa
 Pachygnatha zhui Zhu, Song & Zhang, 2003 — China

Parameta

Parameta Simon, 1895
 Parameta jugularis Simon, 1895 (type) — Sierra Leone

Parazilia

Parazilia Lessert, 1938
 Parazilia strandi Lessert, 1938 (type) — Congo

Pholcipes

Pholcipes Schmidt & Krause, 1993
 Pholcipes bifurcochelis Schmidt & Krause, 1993 (type) — Comoros

Pickardinella

Pickardinella Archer, 1951
 Pickardinella setigera (F. O. Pickard-Cambridge, 1903) (type) — Mexico

Pinkfloydia

Pinkfloydia Dimitrov & Hormiga, 2011
 Pinkfloydia harveyi Dimitrov & Hormiga, 2011 (type) — Australia (Western Australia)
 Pinkfloydia rixi Hormiga, 2017 — Australia (New South Wales)

S

Sancus

Sancus Tullgren, 1910
 Sancus acoreensis (Wunderlich, 1992) — Azores
 Sancus bilineatus Tullgren, 1910 (type) — Kenya, Tanzania

Schenkeliella

Schenkeliella Strand, 1934
 Schenkeliella spinosa (O. Pickard-Cambridge, 1871) (type) — Sri Lanka

T

Taraire

Taraire Álvarez-Padilla, Kallal & Hormiga, 2020
 Taraire oculta Álvarez-Padilla, Kallal & Hormiga, 2020 — New Zealand
 Taraire rufolineata (Urquhart, 1889) (type) — New Zealand

Tawhai

Tawhai 	Álvarez-Padilla, Kallal & Hormiga, 2020
 Tawhai arborea (Urquhart, 1891) (type) — New Zealand

Tetragnatha

Tetragnatha Latreille, 1804
 Tetragnatha acuta Gillespie, 1992 — Hawaii
 Tetragnatha aenea Cantor, 1842 — China
 Tetragnatha aetherea (Simon, 1894) — Venezuela
 Tetragnatha albida Gillespie, 1994 — Hawaii
 Tetragnatha americana Simon, 1905 — Chile, Argentina
 Tetragnatha amoena Okuma, 1987 — New Guinea
 Tetragnatha anamitica Walckenaer, 1841 — Vietnam
 Tetragnatha andamanensis Tikader, 1977 — India (Andaman Is.), Bangladesh
 Tetragnatha andonea Lawrence, 1927 — Namibia
 Tetragnatha angolaensis Okuma & Dippenaar-Schoeman, 1988 — Angola
 Tetragnatha anguilla Thorell, 1877 — Indonesia (Java, Sulawesi), New Guinea, Australia
 Tetragnatha angulata Hogg, 1914 — Australia (Western Australia)
 Tetragnatha anuenue Gillespie, 2002 — Hawaii
 Tetragnatha argentinensis Mello-Leitão, 1931 — Argentina
 Tetragnatha argyroides Mello-Leitão, 1945 — Argentina
 Tetragnatha armata Karsch, 1892 — Sri Lanka
 Tetragnatha atriceps Banks, 1898 — Mexico
 Tetragnatha atristernis Strand, 1913 — Central Africa
 Tetragnatha australis (Mello-Leitão, 1945) — Argentina
 Tetragnatha baculiferens Hingston, 1927 — Myanmar
 Tetragnatha bandapula Barrion-Dupo, Barrion & Heong, 2013 — China
 Tetragnatha beccarii Caporiacco, 1947 — Guyana
 Tetragnatha bengalensis Walckenaer, 1841 — India
 Tetragnatha bicolor White, 1841 — Australia (Tasmania)
 Tetragnatha bidentata Roewer, 1951 — Chile
 Tetragnatha biseriata Thorell, 1881 — New Guinea, Papua New Guinea (New Britain), Australia (Queensland)
 Tetragnatha bishopi Caporiacco, 1947 — Guyana
 Tetragnatha bituberculata L. Koch, 1867 — Japan, New Guinea, Australia
 Tetragnatha boeleni Chrysanthus, 1975 — New Guinea
 Tetragnatha bogotensis Keyserling, 1865 — Colombia
 Tetragnatha boninensis Okuma, 1981 — Japan
 Tetragnatha brachychelis Caporiacco, 1947 — Tanzania, Kenya
 Tetragnatha branda Levi, 1981 — USA
 Tetragnatha brevignatha Gillespie, 1992 — Hawaii
 Tetragnatha bryantae Roewer, 1951 — Puerto Rico
 Tetragnatha caffra (Strand, 1909) — South Africa
 Tetragnatha cambridgei Roewer, 1942 — Mexico, Central America, Puerto Rico
 Tetragnatha caudata Emerton, 1884 — North, Central America, Cuba, Jamaica
 Tetragnatha caudicula (Karsch, 1879) — Russia (Far East), China, Korea, Taiwan, Japan
 Tetragnatha caudifera (Keyserling, 1887) — Australia (New South Wales)
 Tetragnatha cavaleriei Schenkel, 1963 — China
 Tetragnatha cephalothoracis Strand, 1906 — Ethiopia
 Tetragnatha ceylonica O. Pickard-Cambridge, 1869 — South Africa, Seychelles, India, Thailand, Philippines, New Guinea, Japan (Ryukyu Is.)
 Tetragnatha chamberlini (Gajbe, 2004) — India
 Tetragnatha chauliodus (Thorell, 1890) — India, Myanmar to New Guinea, Japan
 Tetragnatha cheni Zhu, Song & Zhang, 2003 — China
 Tetragnatha chinensis (Chamberlin, 1924) — China
 Tetragnatha chiyokoae Castanheira & Baptista, 2020 — China, Taiwan, Japan
 Tetragnatha chrysochlora (Audouin, 1826) — Egypt
 Tetragnatha cladognatha Bertkau, 1880 — Brazil
 Tetragnatha clavigera Simon, 1887 — Sierra Leone, Ivory Coast, Congo
 Tetragnatha cochinensis Gravely, 1921 — India
 Tetragnatha coelestis Pocock, 1901 — India
 Tetragnatha cognata O. Pickard-Cambridge, 1889 — Guatemala to Panama
 Tetragnatha confraterna Banks, 1909 — Costa Rica, Panama
 Tetragnatha conica Grube, 1861 — Russia (Far East)
 Tetragnatha crassichelata Chrysanthus, 1975 — New Guinea
 Tetragnatha cuneiventris Simon, 1900 — Hawaii
 Tetragnatha cylindracea (Keyserling, 1887) — Australia (Queensland, New South Wales)
 Tetragnatha cylindrica Walckenaer, 1841 — New Guinea, Australia, Fiji
 Tetragnatha cylindriformis Lawrence, 1952 — Congo
 Tetragnatha dearmata Thorell, 1873 — North America, Europe, Caucasus, Russia (Europe to Far East)
 Tetragnatha delumbis Thorell, 1891 — India (Nicobar Is.)
 Tetragnatha demissa L. Koch, 1872 — Australia. Introduced to South Africa, Tanzania, Seychelles, Tonga
 Tetragnatha dentatidens Simon, 1907 — Sierra Leone, Congo
 Tetragnatha desaguni Barrion & Litsinger, 1995 — Philippines
 Tetragnatha determinata Karsch, 1892 — Sri Lanka
 Tetragnatha digitata O. Pickard-Cambridge, 1899 — Mexico, Costa Rica
 Tetragnatha eberhardi Okuma, 1992 — Panama
 Tetragnatha elongata Walckenaer, 1841 — North, Central America, Cuba, Jamaica
 Tetragnatha elongata debilis Thorell, 1877 — USA
 Tetragnatha elongata principalis Thorell, 1877 — USA
 Tetragnatha elongata undulata Thorell, 1877 — USA
 Tetragnatha elyunquensis Petrunkevitch, 1930 — Jamaica, Puerto Rico
 Tetragnatha esakii Okuma, 1988 — Taiwan
 Tetragnatha eumorpha Okuma, 1987 — New Guinea
 Tetragnatha eurychasma Gillespie, 1992 — Hawaii
 Tetragnatha exigua Chickering, 1957 — Jamaica
 Tetragnatha exquista Saito, 1933 — Japan
 Tetragnatha extensa (Linnaeus, 1758) (type) — North America, Greenland, Europe, Turkey, Caucasus, Iraq, Russia (Europe to Far East), temperate Asia including China, Korea, Japan
 Tetragnatha extensa brachygnatha Thorell, 1873 — Sweden, Russia (Kamchatka)
 Tetragnatha extensa maracandica Charitonov, 1951 — Iran, Central Asia
 Tetragnatha extensa pulchra Kulczyński, 1891 — Hungary
 Tetragnatha fallax Thorell, 1881 — Indonesia
 Tetragnatha farri Chickering, 1962 — Jamaica
 Tetragnatha filiciphilia Gillespie, 1992 — Hawaii
 Tetragnatha filipes Schenkel, 1936 — China
 Tetragnatha filum Simon, 1907 — Congo, Equatorial Guinea (Bioko), São Tomé and Príncipe
 Tetragnatha flagellans Hasselt, 1882 — Indonesia (Sumatra)
 Tetragnatha flava (Audouin, 1826) — Egypt
 Tetragnatha flavida Urquhart, 1891 — New Zealand
 Tetragnatha fletcheri Gravely, 1921 — India, Bangladesh
 Tetragnatha foai Simon, 1902 — Central, East Africa
 Tetragnatha foliferens Hingston, 1927 — India (Nicobar Is.)
 Tetragnatha foveata Karsch, 1892 — Sri Lanka, Laccadive Is., Maldive Is.
 Tetragnatha fragilis Chickering, 1957 — Panama
 Tetragnatha franganilloi Brignoli, 1983 — Cuba
 Tetragnatha friedericii Strand, 1913 — New Guinea
 Tetragnatha gemmata L. Koch, 1872 — Australia (Queensland)
 Tetragnatha geniculata Karsch, 1892 — Sri Lanka to China, Vietnam
 Tetragnatha gertschi Chickering, 1957 — Panama
 Tetragnatha gibbula Roewer, 1942 — French Guiana
 Tetragnatha gongshan Zhao & Peng, 2010 — China
 Tetragnatha gracilis (Bryant, 1923) — USA, Antigua, Martinique
 Tetragnatha gracillima (Thorell, 1890) — Indonesia (Sumatra)
 Tetragnatha granti Pocock, 1903 — Yemen (Socotra)
 Tetragnatha gressitti Okuma, 1988 — Borneo
 Tetragnatha gressittorum Okuma, 1987 — New Guinea
 Tetragnatha guatemalensis O. Pickard-Cambridge, 1889 — North, Central America, Cuba, Jamaica
 Tetragnatha gui Zhu, Song & Zhang, 2003 — China
 Tetragnatha hamata Thorell, 1898 — Myanmar
 Tetragnatha hasselti Thorell, 1890 — India to China, Indonesia (Sulawesi)
 Tetragnatha hasselti birmanica Sherriffs, 1919 — Myanmar
 Tetragnatha hastula Simon, 1907 — Sierra Leone, Gabon, São Tomé and Príncipe
 Tetragnatha hawaiensis Simon, 1900 — Hawaii
 Tetragnatha heongi Barrion & Barrion-Dupo, 2011 — China
 Tetragnatha hirashimai Okuma, 1987 — New Guinea
 Tetragnatha hiroshii Okuma, 1988 — Taiwan
 Tetragnatha hulli Caporiacco, 1955 — Venezuela
 Tetragnatha insularis Okuma, 1987 — Australia (Lord Howe Is.)
 Tetragnatha insulata Hogg, 1913 — Falkland Is.
 Tetragnatha insulicola Okuma, 1987 — Australia (Lord Howe Is.)
 Tetragnatha intermedia Kulczyński, 1891 — Madeira, Portugal to Turkey
 Tetragnatha iriomotensis Okuma, 1991 — Japan (Okinawa)
 Tetragnatha irridescens Stoliczka, 1869 — India
 Tetragnatha isidis (Simon, 1880) — Europe, Caucasus, Russia (Europe to Far East), Kazakhstan to India
 Tetragnatha iwahigensis Barrion & Litsinger, 1995 — Philippines
 Tetragnatha jaculator Tullgren, 1910 — Africa to China, New Guinea. Introduced to Barbados, Trinidad
 Tetragnatha javana (Thorell, 1890) — Africa, Asia
 Tetragnatha jejuna (Thorell, 1897) — Myanmar
 Tetragnatha josephi Okuma, 1988 — India, Malaysia, Singapore
 Tetragnatha jubensis Pavesi, 1895 — Ethiopia
 Tetragnatha kamakou Gillespie, 1992 — Hawaii
 Tetragnatha kapua Gillespie, 2003 — Marquesas Is.
 Tetragnatha kauaiensis Simon, 1900 — Hawaii
 Tetragnatha kea Gillespie, 1994 — Hawaii
 Tetragnatha keyserlingi Simon, 1890 — Samoa, Fiji, Vanuatu
 Tetragnatha khanjahani Biswas & Raychaudhuri, 1996 — Bangladesh
 Tetragnatha kikokiko Gillespie, 2002 — Hawaii
 Tetragnatha kiwuana Strand, 1913 — Central Africa
 Tetragnatha klossi Hogg, 1919 — Indonesia (Sumatra)
 Tetragnatha kolosvaryi Caporiacco, 1949 — Kenya
 Tetragnatha kukuhaa Gillespie, 2002 — Hawaii
 Tetragnatha kukuiki Gillespie, 2002 — Hawaii
 Tetragnatha labialis Nicolet, 1849 — Chile
 Tetragnatha laboriosa Hentz, 1850 — North, Central America
 Tetragnatha laminalis Strand, 1907 — East Africa
 Tetragnatha lancinans Kulczyński, 1911 — New Guinea
 Tetragnatha laochenga Barrion, Barrion-Dupo & Heong, 2013 — China
 Tetragnatha laqueata L. Koch, 1872 — Japan (Ogasawara Is.) to South Pacific Is.
 Tetragnatha latro Tullgren, 1910 — East Africa
 Tetragnatha lauta Yaginuma, 1959 — China (Hong Kong), Korea, Laos, Taiwan, Japan
 Tetragnatha lea Bösenberg & Strand, 1906 — Russia (Far East), Japan, Korea?
 Tetragnatha lena Gillespie, 2003 — Hawaii
 Tetragnatha lepida Rainbow, 1916 — Australia (Queensland)
 Tetragnatha levii Okuma, 1992 — Mexico
 Tetragnatha lewisi Chickering, 1962 — Jamaica
 Tetragnatha limu Gillespie, 2003 — Hawaii
 Tetragnatha linearis Nicolet, 1849 — Colombia, Chile
 Tetragnatha lineatula Roewer, 1942 — Malaysia
 Tetragnatha linyphioides Karsch, 1878 — Mozambique
 Tetragnatha llavaca Barrion & Litsinger, 1995 — Philippines
 Tetragnatha longidens Mello-Leitão, 1945 — Argentina, Brazil
 Tetragnatha luculenta Simon, 1907 — Guinea-Bissau
 Tetragnatha luteocincta Simon, 1908 — Australia (Western Australia)
 Tetragnatha mabelae Chickering, 1957 — Panama, Trinidad
 Tetragnatha macilenta L. Koch, 1872 — Australia (Norfolk Is.) to French Polynesia (Society Is.)
 Tetragnatha macracantha Gillespie, 1992 — Hawaii
 Tetragnatha macrops Simon, 1907 — São Tomé and Príncipe
 Tetragnatha maculata Blackwall, 1865 — Cape Verde Is.
 Tetragnatha maeandrata Simon, 1908 — Australia (Western Australia)
 Tetragnatha maka Gillespie, 1994 — Hawaii
 Tetragnatha makiharai Okuma, 1977 — Russia (Far East), Japan (mainland, Ryukyu Is.)
 Tetragnatha mandibulata Walckenaer, 1841 — West Africa, India to Philippines, Australia
 Tetragnatha maralba Roberts, 1983 — Seychelles (Aldabra)
 Tetragnatha margaritata L. Koch, 1872 — Australia (Queensland)
 Tetragnatha marginata (Thorell, 1890) — Myanmar to New Caledonia
 Tetragnatha marquesiana Berland, 1935 — Marquesas Is.
 Tetragnatha martinicensis Dierkens, 2011 — Martinique
 Tetragnatha mawambina Strand, 1913 — Central Africa
 Tetragnatha megalocera Castanheira & Baptista, 2020 — Brazil
 Tetragnatha mengsongica Zhu, Song & Zhang, 2003 — China
 Tetragnatha mertoni Strand, 1911 — Indonesia (Aru Is.)
 Tetragnatha mexicana Keyserling, 1865 — Mexico to Panama
 Tetragnatha micrura Kulczyński, 1911 — New Guinea, Solomon Is.
 Tetragnatha minitabunda O. Pickard-Cambridge, 1872 — Syria, Lebanon, Israel
 Tetragnatha modica Kulczyński, 1911 — New Guinea
 Tetragnatha mohihi Gillespie, 1992 — Hawaii
 Tetragnatha montana Simon, 1874 — Europe, Turkey, Caucasus, Russia (Europe to Far East), Central Asia
 Tetragnatha montana timorensis Schenkel, 1944 — Timor
 Tetragnatha monticola Okuma, 1987 — New Guinea
 Tetragnatha moua Gillespie, 2003 — Tahiti
 Tetragnatha moulmeinensis Gravely, 1921 — Myanmar
 Tetragnatha multipunctata Urquhart, 1891 — New Zealand
 Tetragnatha nana Okuma, 1987 — New Guinea
 Tetragnatha nandan Zhu, Song & Zhang, 2003 — China
 Tetragnatha nepaeformis Doleschall, 1859 — Indonesia (Java)
 Tetragnatha nero Butler, 1876 — Mauritius (Rodriguez)
 Tetragnatha netrix Simon, 1900 — Hawaii
 Tetragnatha nigricans Dalmas, 1917 — New Zealand
 Tetragnatha nigrigularis Simon, 1898 — Seychelles
 Tetragnatha nigrita Lendl, 1886 — Europe, Caucasus, Russia (Europe to Far East), Central Asia, China, Japan
 Tetragnatha niokolona Roewer, 1961 — Senegal
 Tetragnatha nitens (Audouin, 1826) — Asia. Introduced to the Americas, Madeira, Canary Is., Europe, Egypt, Madagascar, Pacific islands, New Zealand
 Tetragnatha nitidiuscula Simon, 1907 — West Africa
 Tetragnatha nitidiventris Simon, 1907 — Guinea-Bissau
 Tetragnatha notophilla Boeris, 1889 — Peru
 Tetragnatha noumeensis Berland, 1924 — New Caledonia
 Tetragnatha novia Simon, 1901 — Malaysia
 Tetragnatha nubica Denis, 1955 — Niger
 Tetragnatha obscura Gillespie, 2002 — Hawaii
 Tetragnatha obscuriceps Caporiacco, 1940 — Ethiopia
 Tetragnatha obtusa C. L. Koch, 1837 — Europe, Turkey, Caucasus, Russia (Europe to Far East), Central Asia
 Tetragnatha obtusa corsica Simon, 1929 — France (Corsica)
 Tetragnatha oculata Denis, 1955 — Niger
 Tetragnatha okumae Barrion & Litsinger, 1995 — Philippines
 Tetragnatha olindana Karsch, 1880 — Polynesia
 Tetragnatha oomua Gillespie, 2003 — Marquesas Is.
 Tetragnatha oreobia Okuma, 1987 — New Guinea
 Tetragnatha orizaba (Banks, 1898) — Mexico, Cuba, Jamaica
 Tetragnatha oubatchensis Berland, 1924 — New Caledonia
 Tetragnatha palikea Gillespie, 2003 — Hawaii
 Tetragnatha pallescens F. O. Pickard-Cambridge, 1903 — North, Central America, Caribbean
 Tetragnatha pallida O. Pickard-Cambridge, 1889 — Costa Rica, Panama
 Tetragnatha paludicola Gillespie, 1992 — Hawaii
 Tetragnatha paludis Caporiacco, 1940 — Ethiopia
 Tetragnatha panopea L. Koch, 1872 — Samoan islands
 Tetragnatha papuana Kulczyński, 1911 — New Guinea
 Tetragnatha paradisea Pocock, 1901 — India
 Tetragnatha paradoxa Okuma, 1992 — Costa Rica
 Tetragnatha paraguayensis (Mello-Leitão, 1939) — Paraguay
 Tetragnatha parva Badcock, 1932 — Paraguay
 Tetragnatha parvula Thorell, 1891 — India (Nicobar Is.)
 Tetragnatha paschae Berland, 1924 — Easter Is.
 Tetragnatha perkinsi Simon, 1900 — Hawaii
 Tetragnatha perreirai Gillespie, 1992 — Hawaii
 Tetragnatha phaeodactyla Kulczyński, 1911 — New Guinea
 Tetragnatha pilosa Gillespie, 1992 — Hawaii
 Tetragnatha pinicola L. Koch, 1870 — Europe, Turkey, Caucasus, Russia (Europe to Far East), Central Asia, China, Korea, Japan
 Tetragnatha piscatoria Simon, 1898 — Caribbean
 Tetragnatha planata Karsch, 1892 — Sri Lanka
 Tetragnatha plena Chamberlin, 1924 — China
 Tetragnatha polychromata Gillespie, 1992 — Hawaii
 Tetragnatha praedonia L. Koch, 1878 — Russia (Far East), China, Laos, Korea, Taiwan, Japan
 Tetragnatha priamus Okuma, 1987 — Solomon Is.
 Tetragnatha protensa Walckenaer, 1841 — Madagascar to Australia, New Caledonia, Palau Is.
 Tetragnatha pseudonitens Barrion, Barrion-Dupo & Heong, 2013 — China
 Tetragnatha puella Thorell, 1895 — Myanmar, Indonesia (Sumatra), New Guinea
 Tetragnatha pulchella Thorell, 1877 — Indonesia (Sumatra, Sulawesi
 Tetragnatha punua Gillespie, 2003 — Marquesas Is.
 Tetragnatha quadrinotata Urquhart, 1893 — Australia (Tasmania)
 Tetragnatha quasimodo Gillespie, 1992 — Hawaii
 Tetragnatha quechua Chamberlin, 1916 — Peru
 Tetragnatha radiata Chrysanthus, 1975 — New Guinea
 Tetragnatha ramboi Mello-Leitão, 1943 — Brazil
 Tetragnatha rava Gillespie, 2003 — Tahiti
 Tetragnatha reimoseri (Rosca, 1939) — Central, Eastern Europe
 Tetragnatha renatoi Castanheira & Baptista, 2020 — Venezuela, Brazil, Argentina
 Tetragnatha reni Zhu, Song & Zhang, 2003 — China
 Tetragnatha restricta Simon, 1900 — Hawaii
 Tetragnatha retinens Chamberlin, 1924 — China
 Tetragnatha rimandoi Barrion, 1998 — Philippines
 Tetragnatha rimitarae Strand, 1911 — Polynesia
 Tetragnatha riveti Berland, 1913 — Ecuador
 Tetragnatha roeweri Caporiacco, 1949 — Kenya
 Tetragnatha rossi Chrysanthus, 1975 — New Guinea
 Tetragnatha rouxi (Berland, 1924) — New Caledonia
 Tetragnatha rubriventris Doleschall, 1857 — New Guinea, Australia (Queensland)
 Tetragnatha scopus Chamberlin, 1916 — Peru
 Tetragnatha serra Doleschall, 1857 — Thailand to China (Hong Kong), New Guinea
 Tetragnatha shanghaiensis Strand, 1907 — China
 Tetragnatha shinanoensis Okuma & Chikuni, 1978 — Korea, Japan
 Tetragnatha shoshone Levi, 1981 — USA, Canada, Europe, Kazakhstan, Mongolia, China
 Tetragnatha sidama Caporiacco, 1940 — Ethiopia
 Tetragnatha signata Okuma, 1987 — New Guinea
 Tetragnatha similis Nicolet, 1849 — Chile
 Tetragnatha simintina Roewer, 1961 — Senegal
 Tetragnatha sinuosa Chickering, 1957 — Panama
 Tetragnatha sobrina Simon, 1900 — Hawaii
 Tetragnatha sociella Chamberlin, 1924 — China
 Tetragnatha squamata Karsch, 1879 — Russia (Far East), China, Korea, Taiwan, Japan
 Tetragnatha stelarobusta Gillespie, 1992 — Hawaii
 Tetragnatha stellarum Chrysanthus, 1975 — New Guinea
 Tetragnatha sternalis Nicolet, 1849 — Chile
 Tetragnatha stimulifera Simon, 1907 — Congo
 Tetragnatha straminea Emerton, 1884 — USA, Canada, Cuba
 Tetragnatha strandi Lessert, 1915 — East, Southern Africa
 Tetragnatha strandi melanogaster Schmidt & Krause, 1993 — Comoros
 Tetragnatha streichi Strand, 1907 — China
 Tetragnatha striata L. Koch, 1862 — Europe, Russia (Europe to south Siberia), Kazakhstan
 Tetragnatha subclavigera Strand, 1907 — Congo
 Tetragnatha subesakii Zhu, Song & Zhang, 2003 — China
 Tetragnatha subextensa Petrunkevitch, 1930 — Jamaica, Puerto Rico
 Tetragnatha subsquamata Okuma, 1985 — Tanzania, South Africa
 Tetragnatha suoan Zhu, Song & Zhang, 2003 — China
 Tetragnatha sutherlandi Gravely, 1921 — India
 Tetragnatha tahuata Gillespie, 2003 — Marquesas Is.
 Tetragnatha tanigawai Okuma, 1988 — Japan (Ryukyu Is.)
 Tetragnatha tantalus Gillespie, 1992 — Hawaii
 Tetragnatha taylori O. Pickard-Cambridge, 1891 — South Africa
 Tetragnatha tenera Thorell, 1881 — India, Sri Lanka, Australia (Queensland)
 Tetragnatha tenuis O. Pickard-Cambridge, 1889 — Guatemala to Panama
 Tetragnatha tenuissima O. Pickard-Cambridge, 1889 — Mexico, Caribbean to Brazil
 Tetragnatha tincochacae Chamberlin, 1916 — Peru
 Tetragnatha tipula (Simon, 1894) — West Africa
 Tetragnatha tonkina Simon, 1909 — Vietnam
 Tetragnatha torrensis Schmidt & Piepho, 1994 — Cape Verde Is.
 Tetragnatha trichodes Thorell, 1878 — Indonesia
 Tetragnatha tristani Banks, 1909 — Costa Rica
 Tetragnatha trituberculata Gillespie, 1992 — Hawaii
 Tetragnatha tuamoaa Gillespie, 2003 — Society Is.
 Tetragnatha tullgreni Lessert, 1915 — Central, East Africa
 Tetragnatha uluhe Gillespie, 2003 — Hawaii
 Tetragnatha uncifera Simon, 1900 — Hawaii
 Tetragnatha unicornis Tullgren, 1910 — East, South Africa
 Tetragnatha vacillans (Butler, 1876) — Mauritius (Rodriguez)
 Tetragnatha valida Keyserling, 1887 — Australia (Queensland, New South Wales, Tasmania)
 Tetragnatha vermiformis Emerton, 1884 — Temperate and tropical Asia. Introduced to North and Central America
 Tetragnatha versicolor Walckenaer, 1841 — North, Central America, Cuba
 Tetragnatha virescens Okuma, 1979 — Bangladesh, Sri Lanka to Indonesia, Philippines
 Tetragnatha viridis Walckenaer, 1841 — USA, Canada
 Tetragnatha viridorufa Gravely, 1921 — India
 Tetragnatha visenda Chickering, 1957 — Jamaica
 Tetragnatha waikamoi Gillespie, 1992 — Hawaii
 Tetragnatha yalom Chrysanthus, 1975 — New Guinea, Papua New Guinea (Bismarck Arch.), Australia (Queensland)
 Tetragnatha yesoensis Saito, 1934 — Russia (Far East), China, Korea, Japan
 Tetragnatha yinae Zhao & Peng, 2010 — China
 Tetragnatha yongquiang Zhu, Song & Zhang, 2003 — China
 Tetragnatha zangherii (Caporiacco, 1926) — Italy
 Tetragnatha zhaoi Zhu, Song & Zhang, 2003 — China
 Tetragnatha zhaoya Zhu, Song & Zhang, 2003 — China
 Tetragnatha zhuzhenrongi Barrion, Barrion-Dupo & Heong, 2013 — China

Timonoe

Timonoe Thorell, 1898
 Timonoe argenteozonata Thorell, 1898 (type) — Myanmar

Tylorida

Tylorida Simon, 1894
 Tylorida flava Sankaran, Malamel, Joseph & Sebastian, 2017 — India
 Tylorida marmorea (Pocock, 1901) — India, China
 Tylorida mengla Zhu, Song & Zhang, 2003 — China
 Tylorida mornensis (Benoit, 1978) — Seychelles
 Tylorida seriata Thorell, 1899 — West Africa, Cameroon
 Tylorida striata (Thorell, 1877) (type) — Comoros, India, China, SE Asia to Australia (Queensland)
 Tylorida tianlin Zhu, Song & Zhang, 2003 — China, Laos
 Tylorida ventralis (Thorell, 1877) — India to Taiwan, Japan, New Guinea

W

Wolongia

Wolongia Zhu, Kim & Song, 1997
 Wolongia bicruris Wan & Peng, 2013 — China
 Wolongia bimacroseta Wan & Peng, 2013 — China
 Wolongia erromera Wan & Peng, 2013 — China
 Wolongia foliacea Wan & Peng, 2013 — China
 Wolongia guoi Zhu, Kim & Song, 1997 (type) — China
 Wolongia mutica Wan & Peng, 2013 — China
 Wolongia odontodes Zhao, Yin & Peng, 2009 — China
 Wolongia papafrancisi Malamel, Nafin, Sankaran & Sebastian, 2018 — India
 Wolongia renaria Wan & Peng, 2013 — China
 Wolongia tetramacroseta Wan & Peng, 2013 — China
 Wolongia wangi Zhu, Kim & Song, 1997 — China

Z

Zhinu

Zhinu Kallal & Hormiga, 2018
 Zhinu manmiaoyangi Kallal & Hormiga, 2018 (type) — Taiwan
 Zhinu reticuloides (Yaginuma, 1958) — Korea, Japan

Zygiometella

Zygiometella Wunderlich, 1995
 Zygiometella perlongipes (O. Pickard-Cambridge, 1872) (type) — Israel

References

Tetragnathidae
Tetragnathidae